Emilian Focșeneanu (born 18 January 1966) is a retired Romanian alpine skier. He competed in all five alpine skiing events at the 1992 Winter Olympics with the best result of 23rd place in the combined.

References

1966 births
Living people
Alpine skiers at the 1992 Winter Olympics
Olympic alpine skiers of Romania
Romanian male alpine skiers